Bandpur  is a village in Chanditala I community development block of Srirampore subdivision in Hooghly district in the Indian state of West Bengal.

Geography

Gram panchayat
Villages in Ainya gram panchayat are: Akuni, Aniya, Bandpur, Banipur, Bara Choughara, Dudhkanra, Ganeshpur, Goplapur, Jiara, Kalyanbati, Mukundapur, Sadpur and Shyamsundarpur.

Demographics
As per 2011 Census of India Bandpur had a total population of 3,594 of which 1,825 (51%) were males and 1,769 (49%) were females. Population below 6 years was 494. The total number of literates in Bandpur was 2,574 (83.03% of the population over 6 years).

Transport
The nearest railway stations are the Bargachia railway station and the Baruipara railway station.

References 

Villages in Chanditala I CD Block